The Monument to the Founders of Kyiv is a statue located on the banks of the river Dnipro in , Kyiv, Ukraine.  It was designed by sculptor Vasyl Borodai, and created to commemorate the 1500th anniversary of Kyiv.  The monument was constructed with reinforced concrete and covered in copper leaf.  Completed in 1982, it partially collapsed in 2010, but was restored within a few months.  The monument is considered a symbol of Kyiv.

Description 

The monument depicts siblings Kyi, Shchek, Khoryv, and Lybid, the legendary founders of Kyiv. The four figures stand in a boat, with sister Lybid at the bow with her arms outstretched, while the three brothers are crowded together near the stern holding their weapons, two long thin spears and a bow. The boat rests atop a granite pedestal representing three waves, which itself lies on a platform of red granite.

Borodai based the face of Lybid on that of his daughter, who died at the age of 31.

History 

To commemorate the 1500th anniversary of Kyiv, a number of construction projects were undertaken, including the building of Ukrainian House, the restoration of the Golden Gate, and the raising of this monument to the city's founders. The monument was constructed with reinforced concrete and covered in copper leaf because the Central Committee of the Communist Party of the Soviet Union ordered that nonferrous metals not be used due to financial considerations after the 1980 Summer Olympics.

The monument collapsed partially in 2010, but was restored later that year.  It was selected as the logo to represent the city during the UEFA Euro 2012 football tournament, for which Kyiv was one of the hosts.  In 2021, Navodnytskyi Park was renovated, and Vitali Klitschko, Mayor of Kyiv, opened a fountain next to the monument.  During the 2022 Russian invasion of Ukraine, it was amongst the city's monuments that were protected with sandbags or plywood.

Restoration 

The weather had taken its toll on the sculpture, and the metal frame had completely rotted. The Kyiv City State Administration stated its intention to restore the monument, and at one point, an official of the administration reported that the monument would be replaced by a bronze copy of the original.

The middle of the monument had been reconstructed with waterproof concrete, and a drainage system was added. The restoration work had cost 400 million UAH, and the monument was then predicted to last for at least a century.

Monument in Maidan Nezalezhnosti 

On , a different monument to the founders of Kyiv was inaugurated at Maidan Nezalezhnosti.  Designed by sculptor , the monument in Maidan Nezalezhnosti also features Kyi, Shchek, Khoryv, and Lybid, but has a completely different composition.

Gallery

See also 
 Monument to the founders of Odesa

Notes

References 

1500th anniversary of Kyiv
1982 establishments in Ukraine
1982 sculptures
Concrete sculptures in Ukraine
Monuments and memorials in Kyiv
Outdoor sculptures in Ukraine
Pecherskyi District
Sculptures of men in Ukraine
Sculptures of women in Ukraine
Symbols of Kyiv

uk:Пам'ятний знак на честь заснування міста Києва